"Lily Was Here" is an instrumental duet by English musician David A. Stewart and Dutch saxophonist Candy Dulfer. It was released as a single in 1989 from the soundtrack of the same name for the Dutch movie De Kassière, also known by the English title Lily Was Here. The song reached number one in the Netherlands and became a top-twenty hit in several other European countries, Australia, and the United States.

Background
David A. Stewart invited Candy Dulfer, who had not previously released any of her material, to play the saxophone on this instrumental. The single became a major hit and stayed at the number one position for five weeks in the Netherlands. Because of this success, the single was also released in the United Kingdom, Europe and the United States where it became a hit as well, reaching number six in the UK and even rising to number 11 in the tough U.S. market. The success of this instrumental encouraged Dulfer to compose music for her own album, which she titled Saxuality.

Recording
According to Candy's father Hans Dulfer on Dutch radio, the recording was done in just one take, actually a jam session, and at that time not meant to be released. This jam session was done at the end of a day of recording for the movie De Kassière, and Dave Stewart later decided to release this as a single.

Track listings
CD maxi
 "Lily Was Here" — 4:19
 "Lily Was Here" (Space Centre Medical Unit Hum) — 8:10
 "Lily Robs the Bank" — 2:33

CD maxi
 "Lily Was Here" — 4:19
 "Lily Robs the Bank" — 2:33
 "Here Comes the Rain Again" — 6:00

7-inch single
 "Lily Was Here" — 4:19
 "Lily Robs the Bank" — 2:33

3-inch single
 "Lily Was Here" — 4:19
 "Lily Robs the Bank" — 2:33

12-inch maxi
 "Lily Was Here" (Space Centre Medical Unit Hum) — 8:10
 "Lily Was Here" (Orbital Space Lab Mix) — 6:57
 "Lily Robs the Bank" — 2:33

Personnel

General
 Guitar by David A. Stewart
 Saxophone by Candy Dulfer
 Drums by Swedish producer & percussionist Olle Romo (formerly Eurythmics drummer mid-to-late 80's)
 Artwork by The Leisure Company
"Lily Was Here"
 Engineered by Stephen McLaughlin
 Remixed by Gary Bradshaw

"Lily Was Here" (Space Centre Medical Unit Hum)
 Engineered by Steve McLaughlin
 Remixed by The Orb
Lily Was Here (Orbital Space Lab Mix)
 Remixed by The Orb

Charts

Weekly charts

Year-end charts

Certifications

References

1980s instrumentals
1989 debut singles
1989 songs
1990 singles
1991 singles
Candy Dulfer songs
David A. Stewart songs
Dutch Top 40 number-one singles
Instrumental duets